Rotunda Glacier is a tributary glacier flowing north between Ugolini Peak and La Count Mountain into upper Ferrar Glacier, Victoria Land. The name Rotunda Glacier was used for this feature in the report "Tephra in Glacier Ice" by J.R. Keys, P.W. Anderton, and P.R. Kyle following the 1973–74 and 1974–75 seasons. Named in association with the  butte of the same name on the west side of the glacier.

References

 
 

Glaciers of Victoria Land
Scott Coast